Disney's Celebrate America is a seasonal fireworks show that premiered on July 3, 2008 at the Magic Kingdom theme park in the Walt Disney World outside Orlando, Florida, on July 4 of that same year at Disneyland in Anaheim, California, and on July 1, 2011 at Disney California Adventure in Anaheim, California. The 15-minute show, produced by Disney Live Entertainment under creative director Steve Davison, celebrates the traditions, spirit and music of the United States of America, and is shown in lieu of the regular fireworks shows on both July 3 and 4 at Walt Disney World's Magic Kingdom, Disneyland, and Disney California Adventure. While these parks use the same soundtrack, the fireworks used are different, due to Anaheim and Orlando's fireworks laws being more strict. This is the first time in history that Disneyland, Magic Kingdom, and Disney California Adventure share similar fireworks shows (although Disney California Adventure version was shorter than Disneyland and Magic Kingdom parks).

History
Two previews of the show at the Magic Kingdom were held on June 29 and July 1, 2008. The show at Magic Kingdom uses all perimeter firework sites, giving a 360-degree effect from inside the park, with more than 1500 shells launched in the show. Previously, at Magic Kingdom, a special Independence Day-themed version of Fantasy in the Sky was held on July 4.

During its debut on July 4, 2008, the Disneyland version of the show was canceled 11 minutes into the performance due to debris falling on Ball Road behind Disneyland from winds at high elevation. Starting with the 2009 show, Disneyland has performed four showings of the display. A shortened 9-minute version of the display is shown July 1–3, while the full 15-minute version is shown on July 4.

In 2011, Disneyland version was updated to include some new pyrotechnics, new castle lighting, Gobo projections and searchlights used for Magical and Halloween Screams into the show. Also in the same year, Disney California Adventure introduced its own version for the show into World of Color pre-show.

In 2013, as part of Limited Time Magic, the show was performed July 1–7 at both Magic Kingdom and Disneyland parks. For the Magic Kingdom performances, the 180-degree perimeter effect was used on the July 1–2 and 5-7 shows while the full 360-degree perimeter fireworks were shown on both July 3 and 4. At Disneyland, the full display was shown on July 4, while the remaining performances featured the 9-minute abridged version.

Since 2015, the Disneyland version utilizing the projection technology and searchlights used for Disneyland Forever.

In 2019, there were some changes for both shows in Magic Kingdom and Disneyland. For the Magic Kingdom version, the show has returned with the increased amount of pyrotechnics in Cinderella Castle. For the Disneyland version, the show has returned with the increased amount of small-sized firework shells on the rooftops of It's a Small World & Mickey & Minnie's Runaway Railway.

The Show 

Introduction

As the lights dim, the sounds of animals and Native American drums can be heard. A male voice (Corey Burton) narrates the show. Beginning from 2022 version, an unknown female voice narrates the show.

Male narrator (2008–2019) and Female narrator (2022–present): America! A land where eagles soar! Since history began, its people have celebrated the magnificence of this land. Tonight we celebrate America; a land of many people. A country that continues to grow. A nation of courage and independence. America, the beautiful! 

Music: Celebrate America! Theme

Celebrate Freedom and Independence

Male narrator (2008–2019): To honor Independence Day, we welcome you to our Fourth of July celebration as we commemorate the birthday of this great nation. With joy, we celebrate the United States of America; a vast mosaic of individuality and inspiration. A vibrant palette of cultures and colors. A country whose pioneering spirit continues to live on in the hearts and minds of people who cherish freedom; in this land and around the globe.

Female narrator (2022–present): In honor of the Fourth of July, we invite you to come together as we commemorate the enduring spirit of this great nation. With joy, we celebrate the United States of America; a vast mosaic of individuality and inspiration. A vibrant palette of cultures and colors. A country whose pioneering spirit continues to live on in the hearts and minds of people who cherish freedom; in this land and around the globe.

Music: "God Bless America" (Irving Berlin), "The Yankee Doodle Boy" (George M. Cohan) and "This Is My Country" (Don Raye and Al Jacobs).

American Folk Songs*

Male narrator (2008–2019) and Female narrator (2022–present): The Spirit of America continues to inspire those who believe in their dreams. From sea to shining sea, we are proud to share all this great and beautiful nation has to offer. In the words and melodies of beloved American folk songs, that enduring spirit is found in the music of our land.

Music: "America the Beautiful" (Katharine Lee Bates and Samuel A. Ward), "This Land is Your Land" (Woody Guthrie), "Home on the Range", "Oh My Darling, Clementine" (Percy Montrose), "Oh! Susanna" (Stephen Foster), "She'll Be Coming 'Round the Mountain", "Red River Valley" and "Oh Shenandoah".

This section is absent in the abridged version of the Disneyland display shown from July 1–3.
Beginning from 2022 Magic Kingdom version, "Oh! Susanna" and "Red River Valley" songs had been cut from the show.

A Salute to the Red, White and Blue

Male narrator (2008–2019) and Female narrator (2022–present): Just as the fifty stars and thirteen stripes are so grandly united upon Old Glory, our nation's flag unites us all. Let us join together to give salute to the red, white and blue. And cheer the hopes and dreams that continue to shine throughout America.

Music: "You're a Grand Old Flag" (George M. Cohen), "Stars and Stripes Forever" (John Philip Sousa) and "The Star-Spangled Banner" (Francis Scott Key).

Following the "Star-Spangled Banner", the show ends in a massive display of fireworks.

In 2015, the final segment with a different narration, was featured at the end of "Disneyland Forever", "Together Forever – A Pixar Nighttime Spectacular" in 2018, and "Mickey's Mix Magic" in 2021 as an Independence Day tag.

References

Independence Day (United States) festivals
Walt Disney Parks and Resorts fireworks
Magic Kingdom
Disneyland
Disney California Adventure